The Tears of Hercules is the thirty-first studio album by British singer-songwriter Rod Stewart. It was released on 12 November 2021 through Warner and Rhino. It was produced by Stewart and Kevin Savigar.

Background
Stewart began a songwriting and production partnership with Kevin Savigar in the early 2010s, and they experienced widespread commercial success with Time (2013), Another Country (2015) and Blood Red Roses (2018). Stewart then released a series of compilation albums, including You're in My Heart, Cupid and a box set of material recorded between 1975 and 1978.

Music and lyrics
Stewart co-wrote nine of the album's tracks with Kevin Savigar and Emerson Swinford. "I Can't Imagine" is dedicated to Stewart's wife Penny Lancaster. "Hold On" addresses topical issues including bigotry and racism, with a reference to civil rights activist John Lewis. "Born to Boogie" is dedicated to Marc Bolan.

The title track was written by Canadian singer-songwriter Marc Jordan and composer Stephan Moccio, and originally released on Jordan's album Make Believe Ballroom (2004). Jordan had previously co-written "Rhythm of My Heart" with John Capek, a major hit for Stewart in 1991. The album also includes covers of "Some Kind of Wonderful" and the Johnny Cash song "These Are My People".

Release and promotion
The Tears of Hercules was released on 12 November 2021. "One More Time" was released as the lead single on 16 September 2021 with an accompanying music video filmed in London on 21 August 2021. "Hold On" was released as the second single on 15 October 2021. "I Can't Imagine" followed as the third single on 5 November 2021, with an accompanying music video.

On the day of release, Stewart promoted the album on television shows including The Kelly Clarkson Show, The Late Show with Stephen Colbert and The Graham Norton Show.

Artwork
The photograph used for the cover artwork of The Tears of Hercules was taken by Penny Lancaster during the video shoot for "One More Time". It depicts Stewart wearing an embroidered military-style jacket and a necklace that reads "Celtic", in support of Celtic Football Club.

Critical reception 

The Tears of Hercules was met with mixed reviews from music critics. On Metacritic, which assigns a normalised score out of 100 to ratings from publications, the album received a weighted mean score of 57 based on 5 reviews, indicating "mixed or average reviews".

Referencing Stewart's songwriting, AllMusic's Stephen Thomas Erlewine wrote that Stewart is "in a decidedly looser frame of mind" than he was on Time (2013). He described the album as "alternately baffling, absurd, sweet, and endearing". Writing for Classic Rock magazine, Paul Moody stated that Stewart has "always been a master interpreter of other people’s material", describing the title track as an "atmospheric ballad". In American Songwriter, Hal Horowitz was critical of the album's songwriting and production, but stated that "a few moments almost save this from moving into the “better luck next time” pile." In a wholly negative review for The Independent, Roisin O'Connor described the album as a "12-track cringefest" where "Stewart celebrates carnal love in between songs about his late father".

Track listing

Personnel
Credits adapted from the album's liner notes.

Musicians

 Rod Stewart – vocals (all tracks), production (all tracks)
 Kevin Savigar – production (all tracks), keyboards (all tracks), programming (all tracks)
 Emerson Swinford – guitars (2, 4-7, 9, 11), bass (5-6)
 Mike Severs – guitars (10)
 J'Anna Jacoby – violin (1), fiddles (3)
 Jimmy Roberts – saxophone (10)
 David Palmer – drums (5)
 Julia Thornton – percussion (3-5, 8-9, 11-12)
 Amanda Miller – backing vocals (1-6, 8-10, 12)
 Holly Brewer – backing vocals (1-10, 12)
 Gemma Mewse – backing vocals (1-10)
 Harlano Weekes – backing vocals (4, 8-11)
 Adeola Shyllon – backing vocals (4, 8-9, 11)
 Mark Agyei – backing vocals (4, 8-11)
 Melissa Veszi – backing vocals (4, 8-9, 11)
 Sabrina Adel – backing vocals (4, 8-9, 11)
 Taya Plant – backing vocals (4, 8-9, 11)
 Roo Saville – backing vocals (7-8, 12)
 Jessica Childress – backing vocals (9)
 T Jay Weekes – backing vocals (10)

Technical
 Kevin Savigar – recording, mixing
 Joe Bozzi – mastering
 Sheryl Farber – project assistance
 Lisa Glines – project assistance
 Patrick Milligan – project assistance
 Susanne Savage – project assistance

Design
 Penny Lancaster – photography
 Rory Wilson – art direction, design
 Kristin Attaway – packaging manager

Charts

Weekly charts

Year-end charts

Certifications

References

2021 albums
Rod Stewart albums
Albums produced by Rod Stewart
Rhino Entertainment albums
Warner Music Group albums